Mkhitar Sebastatsi Educational Complex, is a state-owned school located in the Malatia-Sebastia District of Yerevan, the capital of Armenia. The school is named after the prominent Armenian scholar and theologian Mkhitar Sebastatsi of the 18th century.

Overview
The school was founded in 1984 as School No. 183 by Ashot Dabaghyan, Ashot Manucharyan, and Ashot Bleyan. The school was granted "experimental" status by the Soviet Armenian Ministry of Education in 1987 and expanded into a complex in 1989. It played a key role in the Karabakh movement during perestroika and one of its founders Ashot Manucharyan; was a member of the Karabakh Committee.  Its current principal is Ashot Bleyan.

Structure
The structure of the complex is as follows:
Kindergarten
Primary school
Middle school
High school
Art school for juniors
Art school for seniors
Crafts school for seniors
Sports school
Music and dance school

References

Armenian schools
Educational institutions established in 1984
Alternative education
Schools in Armenia
1984 establishments in the Soviet Union
Schools in the Soviet Union